Michael Christopher Stokes (26 March 1933 – 25 May 2012) was a British Professor of Greek.

Childhood and education
Michael Stokes was born in Clitheroe, Lancashire, England. The family moved to Oxford in 1939. Stokes was educated at the Dragon School (Oxford), Eton College, and St John's College, Cambridge, where he gained a double first degree in classics.

Career
Michael Stokes taught for a year at Balliol College, Oxford. He was then appointed lecturer in Greek at the University of Edinburgh (Scotland) in 1956. He moved to Cornell University to become an associate professor in the United States in 1970. His book One and Many in Presocratic Philosophy was published in 1971. In 1974 he returned to the UK to take up a position as Professor of Greek at Durham University. His book, Plato's Socratic Conversations, appeared in 1986. He retired in 1993 to become an Honorary Research Fellow in the Department of Classics at Royal Holloway, University of London.

Personal life
Stokes was married (later separated) and had three children.

References

External links
 Michael C. Stokes information at the Library of Congress

1933 births
2012 deaths
People from Clitheroe
People educated at The Dragon School
People educated at Eton College
Alumni of St John's College, Cambridge
English classical scholars
Scholars of ancient Greek history
Fellows of Balliol College, Oxford
Academics of the University of Edinburgh
Cornell University faculty
Academics of Durham University
Academics of Royal Holloway, University of London